Fairground People is a 1930 German comedy film directed by Carl Lamac and starring Anny Ondra, Sig Arno and Margarete Kupfer. The film was made shortly after the sound revolution, which had damaged Ondra's career in British films and led her to return to Germany. It showcased Ondra's talents as a musical comedy star who sings and dances. Ondra's character dresses up as Mickey Mouse for her performances, and the film was known by the alternative title of Mickey Mouse Girl (Das Micky-Maus-Girl).

Cast
 Anny Ondra as Anny Flock
 Sig Arno as Hannes, Ausrufer
 Margarete Kupfer as Annys Mutter
 Viktor Schwanneke as Annys Vater
 Toni Girardi as Ordini
 Max Ehrlich as Horbes, Agent
 Kurt Gerron as Schaubudenbesitzer
 Gretl Basch as Mimi
 Yvette Rodin as Lily
 Julius Falkenstein
 Paul Morgan
 Walter Norbert
 Paul Rehkopf
 Fritz Spira
 Bruno Arno

References

Bibliography

External links 
 

1930 films
Films of the Weimar Republic
German comedy films
1930 comedy films
1930s German-language films
Films directed by Karel Lamač
German black-and-white films
1930s German films